Bunge Corporation v Tradax Export SA  is an English contract law case, concerning the right to terminate performance of a contract.

Facts
Bunge Corp sued Tradax SA for wrongful termination of its agreement to supply Bunge with  5,000 tons of soya bean meal on the basis that giving notice four days late for loading the ship was not so bad. The soya bean meal was going on three shipments from a port in the Gulf of Mexico nominated by Tradax and on a ship nominated by Bunge. One of the shipments was to be during June 1975. Clause 7 said Bunge was to ‘give at least 15 days consecutive notice’ of the readiness of the ship for loading (i.e. which at the time mean 13 June). Bunge gave notice on 17 June. Tradax argued this was a breach and purported to terminate and recover damages for the difference between the contract price and the market price (which had just fallen).

Judgment
The House of Lords held that proper construction of the contract meant clause 7 was a condition, so Tradax had been entitled to terminate. The contract had to be construed to give effect to the parties' intentions, and although because it allows the right to terminate one would not quickly hold that in mercantile contracts agreements contained conditions, this one did. Lord Wilberforce said the following.

Lord Scarman and Lord Roskill concurred.

See also

 English contract law

References
  
 

English contract case law
1981 in case law
1981 in British law
House of Lords cases
Lord Wilberforce cases